The 2022 United States House of Representatives elections were held November 8, 2022, to elect representatives from all 435 congressional districts across each of the 50 U.S. states. Five of the six non-voting delegates from the District of Columbia and the inhabited U.S. territories were also  elected (Puerto Rico's delegate, the Resident Commissioner, serves four year terms and was last elected in 2020). Numerous federal, state, and local elections, including the 2022 U.S. Senate elections, were also held on this date.

Election ratings

Latest published ratings for competitive seats 
Several sites and individuals publish ratings of competitive seats. The seats listed below are considered competitive (not "safe" or "solid") by at least one of the rating groups. These ratings are based upon factors such as the strength of the incumbent (if the incumbent is running for re-election), the strength of the candidates, and the partisan history of the district (the Cook Partisan Voting Index (CPVI) is one example of this metric). Each rating describes the likelihood of a given outcome in the election.

Most election ratings use:
 Tossup: no advantage
 Tilt (sometimes used): very slight advantage
 Lean: significant, but not overwhelming advantage
 Likely: strong, but not certain advantage
 Safe or Solid: outcome is nearly certain

<div style="overflow-x:auto;>
{| class="wikitable sortable" style="text-align:center"
|- valign=bottom
! District
! CPVI
! Incumbent
! Last result
! Cook
! IE
! Sabato
! Politico
! RCP
! Fox
! DDHQ
! 538
! Econ.
! Winner
|-
! 
| 
|  data-sort-value="Peltola Mary" | Mary Peltola (D)
|  data-sort-value=-51.5 | 51.5% D
| 
| 
| 
| 
| 
| 
| 
| 
| 
| data-sort-value=-1  | Mary Peltola (D)
|-
! 
| 
|  data-sort-value="Schweikert David" | David Schweikert (R)
|  data-sort-value=52.2 | 52.2% R
| 
| 
| 
| 
| 
| 
| 
| 
| 
| data-sort-value=-1  | David Schweikert (R)
|-
! 
| 
|  data-sort-value="O'Halleran Tom" | Tom O'Halleran (D)
|  data-sort-value=-51.6 | 51.6% D
| 
| 
| 
| 
| 
| 
| 
| 
| 
| data-sort-value=-1  | Eli Crane (R)
|-
! 
| 
|  data-sort-value="Stanton Greg" | Greg Stanton (D)
|  data-sort-value=-61.6 | 61.6% D
| 
| 
| 
| 
| 
| 
| 
| 
| 
| data-sort-value=-1  | Greg Stanton (D)
|-
! 
| 
|  data-sort-value="Kirkpatrick Ann" | Ann Kirkpatrick (D)
|  data-sort-value=-55.1 | 55.1% D
| 
| 
| 
| 
| 
| 
| 
| 
| 
| data-sort-value=-1  | Juan Ciscomani (R)
|-
! 
| 
|  | New seat
| –
| 
| 
| 
| 
| 
| 
| 
| 
| 
| data-sort-value=-1  | Kevin Kiley (R) 
|-
! 
| 
|  data-sort-value="Bera Ami" | Ami Bera (D)
|  data-sort-value=-56.6 | 56.6% D
| 
| 
| 
| 
| 
| 
| 
| 
| 
| data-sort-value=-1  | Ami Bera (D) 
|-
! 
| 
|  data-sort-value="Harder Josh" | Josh Harder (D)
|  data-sort-value=-55.2 | 55.2% D
| 
| 
| 
| 
| 
| 
| 
| 
| 
| data-sort-value=-1  | Josh Harder (D)
|-
! 
| 
|  | New seat
| –
| 
| 
| 
| 
| 
| 
| 
| 
| 
| data-sort-value=-1  | John Duarte (R)
|-
! 
| 
|  data-sort-value="Costa Jim" | Jim Costa (D)
|  data-sort-value=-59.4 | 59.4% D
| 
| 
| 
| 
| 
| 
| 
| 
| 
| data-sort-value=-1  | Jim Costa (D)
|-
! 
| 
|  data-sort-value="Valadao David" | David Valadao (R)
|  data-sort-value=50.4 | 50.4% R
| 
| 
| 
| 
| 
| 
| 
| 
| 
| data-sort-value=-1  | David Valadao (R) 
|-
! 
| 
|  data-sort-value="Obernolte Jay" | Jay Obernolte (R)
|  data-sort-value=56.1 | 56.1% R
| 
| 
| 
| 
| 
| 
| 
| 
| 
| data-sort-value=-1  | Jay Obernolte (R) 
|-
! 
| 
|  data-sort-value="Ruiz Raul" | Raul Ruiz (D)
|  data-sort-value=-60.3 | 60.3% D
| 
| 
| 
| 
| 
| 
| 
| 
| 
| data-sort-value=-1  | Raul Ruiz (D) 
|-
! 
| 
|  data-sort-value="Brownley Julia" | Julia Brownley (D)
|  data-sort-value=-60.6 | 60.6% D
| 
| 
| 
| 
| 
| 
| 
| 
| 
| data-sort-value=-1  | Julia Brownley (D)
|-
! 
| 
|  data-sort-value="Garcia Mike" | Mike Garcia (R)
|  data-sort-value=50.0 | 50.0% R
| 
| 
| 
| 
| 
| 
| 
| 
| 
| data-sort-value=-1  | Mike Garcia (R)
|-
! 
| 
|  data-sort-value="Kim Young" | Young Kim (R)
|  data-sort-value=50.6 | 50.6% R
| 
| 
| 
| 
| 
| 
| 
| 
| 
| data-sort-value=-1  | Young Kim (R) 
|-
! 
| 
|  data-sort-value="Calvert Ken" | Ken Calvert (R)
|  data-sort-value=57.1 | 57.1% R
| 
| 
| 
| 
| 
| 
| 
| 
| 
| data-sort-value=-1  | Ken Calvert (R)
|-
! 
| 
|  data-sort-value="Steel Michelle" | Michelle Steel (R)
|  data-sort-value=51.1 | 51.1% R
| 
| 
| 
| 
| 
| 
| 
| 
| 
| data-sort-value=-1  | Michelle Steel (R)
|-
! 
| 
|  data-sort-value="Porter Katie" | Katie Porter (D)
|  data-sort-value=-53.5 | 53.5% D
| 
| 
| 
| 
| 
| 
| 
| 
| 
| data-sort-value=-1  | Katie Porter (D)
|-
! 
| 
|  data-sort-value="Levin Mike" | Mike Levin (D)
|  data-sort-value=-53.1 | 53.1% D
| 
| 
| 
| 
| 
| 
| 
| 
| 
| data-sort-value=-1  | Mike Levin (D)
|-
! 
| 
|  data-sort-value="Boebert Lauren" | Lauren Boebert (R)
|  data-sort-value=51.4 | 51.4% R
| 
| 
| 
| 
| 
| 
| 
| 
| 
| data-sort-value=-1  | Lauren Boebert (R) 
|-
! 
| 
|  data-sort-value="Lamborn Doug" | Doug Lamborn (R)
|  data-sort-value=57.6 | 57.6% R
| 
| 
| 
| 
| 
| 
| 
| 
| 
| data-sort-value=-1  | Doug Lamborn (R) 
|-
! 
| 
|  data-sort-value="Perlmutter Ed" | Ed Perlmutter (D)
|  data-sort-value=-59.1 | 59.1% D
| 
| 
| 
| 
| 
| 
| 
| 
| 
| data-sort-value=-1  | Brittany Pettersen (D)
|-
! 
| 
|  | New seat
| –
| 
| 
| 
| 
| 
| 
| 
| 
| 
| data-sort-value=-1  | Yadira Caraveo (D)
|-
! 
| 
|  data-sort-value="Courtney Joe" | Joe Courtney (D)
|  data-sort-value=-59.4 | 59.4% D
| 
| 
| 
| 
| 
| 
| 
| 
| 
| data-sort-value=-1  | Joe Courtney (D)
|-
! 
| 
|  data-sort-value="DeLauro Rosa" | Rosa DeLauro (D)
|  data-sort-value=-58.7 | 58.7% D
| 
| 
| 
| 
| 
| 
| 
| 
| 
| data-sort-value=-1  | Rosa DeLauro (D) 
|-
! 
| 
|  data-sort-value="Hayes Jahana" | Jahana Hayes (D)
|  data-sort-value=-55.1 | 55.1% D
| 
| 
| 
| 
| 
| 
| 
| 
| 
| data-sort-value=-1  | Jahana Hayes (D) 
|-
! 
| 
|  data-sort-value="Lawson Al" | Al Lawson (D) andNeal Dunn (R)
|  data-sort-value=-65.1 | 65.1% D; 97.9% R
| 
| 
| 
| 
| 
| 
| 
| 
| 
| data-sort-value=-1  | Neal Dunn (R) 
|-
! 
| 
|  | New seat
| –
| 
| 
| 
| 
| 
| 
| 
| 
| 
| data-sort-value=-1  | Aaron Bean (R) 
|-
! 
| 
|  data-sort-value="Murphy Stephanie" | Stephanie Murphy (D)
|  data-sort-value=-55.3 | 55.3% D
| 
| 
| 
| 
| 
| 
| 
| 
| 
| data-sort-value=-1  | Cory Mills (R)
|-
! 
| 
|  data-sort-value="Soto Darren" | Darren Soto (D)
|  data-sort-value=-56.0 | 56.0% D
| 
| 
| 
| 
| 
| 
| 
| 
| 
| data-sort-value=-1  | Darren Soto (D)
|-
! 
| 
| Vacant
|  data-sort-value=-53.0 | 53.0% D
| 
| 
| 
| 
| 
| 
| 
| 
| 
| data-sort-value=-1  | Anna Paulina Luna (R)  
|-
! 
| 
|  data-sort-value="Castor Kathy " | Kathy Castor (D)
|  data-sort-value=-60.3 | 60.3% D
| 
| 
| 
| 
| 
| 
| 
| 
| 
| data-sort-value=-1  | Kathy Castor (D) 
|-
! 
| 
|  | New seat
| –
| 
| 
| 
| 
| 
| 
| 
| 
| 
| data-sort-value=-1  | Laurel Lee (R)
|-
! 
| 
|  data-sort-value="Buchanan Vern " | Vern Buchanan (R)
|  data-sort-value=55.5 | 55.5% R
| 
| 
| 
| 
| 
| 
| 
| 
| 
| data-sort-value=-1  | Vern Buchanan (R)
|-
! 
| 
|  data-sort-value="Frankel Lois" | Lois Frankel (D)
|  data-sort-value=-59.0 | 59.0% D
| 
| 
| 
| 
| 
| 
| 
| 
| 
| data-sort-value=-1  | Lois Frankel (D)
|-
! 
| 
| Vacant
|  data-sort-value=-58.6 | 58.6% D
| 
| 
| 
| 
| 
| 
| 
| 
| 
| data-sort-value=-1  | Jared Moskowitz (D)
|-
! 
| 
|  data-sort-value="Elvira Salazar María" | María Elvira Salazar (R)
|  data-sort-value=51.4 | 51.4% R
| 
| 
| 
| 
| 
| 
| 
| 
| 
| data-sort-value=-1  | María Elvira Salazar (R)
|-
! 
| 
|  data-sort-value="A. Giménez Carlos" | Carlos A. Giménez (R)
|  data-sort-value=51.7 | 51.7% R
| 
| 
| 
| 
| 
| 
| 
| 
| 
| data-sort-value=-1  | Carlos A. Giménez (R) 
|-
! 
| 
|  data-sort-value="Bishop Sanford" | Sanford Bishop (D)
|  data-sort-value=-59.1 | 59.1% D
| 
| 
| 
| 
| 
| 
| 
| 
| 
| data-sort-value=-1  | Sanford Bishop (D) 
|-
! 
| 
|  | New seat
| –
| 
| 
| 
| 
| 
| 
| 
| 
| 
| data-sort-value=-1  | Rich McCormick (R) 
|-
! 
| 
|  data-sort-value="Allen Rick" | Rick W. Allen (R)
|  data-sort-value=58.4 | 58.4% R
| 
| 
| 
| 
| 
| 
| 
| 
| 
| data-sort-value=-1  | Rick W. Allen (R)
|-
! 
| 
|  data-sort-value="Casten Sean" | Sean Casten (D)
|  data-sort-value=-52.8 | 52.8% D
| 
| 
| 
| 
| 
| 
| 
| 
|  
| data-sort-value=-1  | Sean Casten (D) 
|-
! 
| 
|  data-sort-value="Krishnamoorthi Raja" | Raja Krishnamoorthi (D)
|  data-sort-value=-73.2 | 73.2% D
| 
| 
| 
| 
| 
| 
| 
| 
| 
| data-sort-value=-1  | Raja Krishnamoorthi (D) 
|-
! 
| 
|  data-sort-value="Foster Bill" | Bill Foster (D)
|  data-sort-value=-63.3 | 63.3% D
| 
| 
| 
| 
| 
| 
| 
| 
| 
| data-sort-value=-1  | Bill Foster (D)
|-
! 
| 
|  | New seat
| –
| 
| 
| 
| 
| 
| 
| 
| 
| 
| data-sort-value=-1  | Nikki Budzinski (D)
|-
! 
| 
|  data-sort-value="Underwood Lauren" | Lauren Underwood (D)
|  data-sort-value=-50.7 | 50.7% D
| 
| 
| 
| 
| 
| 
| 
| 
| 
| data-sort-value=-1  | Lauren Underwood (D) 
|-
! 
| 
|  data-sort-value="Bustos Cheri" | Cheri Bustos (D)
|  data-sort-value=-52.0 | 52.0% D
| 
| 
| 
| 
| 
| 
| 
| 
| 
| data-sort-value=-1  | Eric Sorensen (D) 
|-
! 
| 
|  data-sort-value="Mrvan Frank" | Frank J. Mrvan (D)
|  data-sort-value=-56.6 | 56.6% D
| 
| 
| 
| 
| 
| 
| 
| 
| 
| data-sort-value=-1  | Frank J. Mrvan (D)
|-
! 
| 
|  data-sort-value="Miller-Meeks Mariannette" | Mariannette Miller-Meeks (R)
|  data-sort-value=49.9 | 49.9% R
| 
| 
| 
| 
| 
| 
| 
| 
| 
| data-sort-value=-1  | Mariannette Miller-Meeks (R) 
|-
! 
| 
|  data-sort-value="Hinson Ashley" | Ashley Hinson (R)
|  data-sort-value=51.2 | 51.2% R
| 
| 
| 
| 
| 
| 
| 
| 
| 
| data-sort-value=-1  | Ashley Hinson (R) 
|-
! 
| 
|  data-sort-value="Axne Cindy" | Cindy Axne (D)
|  data-sort-value=-48.9 | 48.9% D
| 
| 
| 
| 
| 
| 
| 
| 
| 
| data-sort-value=-1  | Zach Nunn (R) 
|-
! 
| 
|  data-sort-value="Davids Sharice" | Sharice Davids (D)
|  data-sort-value=-53.6 | 53.6% D
| 
| 
| 
| 
| 
| 
| 
| 
| 
| data-sort-value=-1  | Sharice Davids (D)
|-
! 
| 
|  data-sort-value="Golden Jared" | Jared Golden (D)
|  data-sort-value=-53.0 | 53.0% D
| 
| 
| 
| 
| 
| 
| 
| 
| 
| data-sort-value=-1  | Jared Golden (D)
|-
! 
| 
|  data-sort-value="Harris Andy" | Andy Harris (R)
|  data-sort-value=63.4 | 63.4% R
| 
| 
| 
| 
| 
| 
| 
| 
| 
| data-sort-value=-1  | Andy Harris (R) 
|-
! 
| 
|  data-sort-value="Ruppersberger Dutch" | Dutch Ruppersberger (D)
|  data-sort-value=-67.7 | 67.7% D
| 
| 
| 
| 
| 
| 
| 
| 
| 
| data-sort-value=-1  | Dutch Ruppersberger (D) 
|-
! 
| 
|  data-sort-value="Sarbanes John" | John Sarbanes (D)
|  data-sort-value=-69.2 | 69.2% D
| 
| 
| 
| 
| 
| 
| 
| 
| 
| data-sort-value=-1  | John Sarbanes (D) 
|-
! 
| 
|  data-sort-value="Trone David" | David Trone (D)
|  data-sort-value=-58.8 | 58.8% D
| 
| 
| 
| 
| 
| 
| 
| 
| 
| data-sort-value=-1  | David Trone (D) 
|-
! 
| 
|  data-sort-value="Keating Bill" | Bill Keating (D)
|  data-sort-value=-61.3 | 61.3% D
| 
| 
| 
| 
| 
| 
| 
| 
| 
| data-sort-value=-1  | Bill Keating (D)
|-
! 
| 
|  data-sort-value="Meijer Peter" | Peter Meijer (R) 
|  data-sort-value=53.0 | 53.0% R
| 
| 
| 
| 
| 
| 
| 
| 
| 
| data-sort-value=-1  | Hillary Scholten (D)
|-
! 
| 
|  data-sort-value="Huizenga Bill" | Bill Huizenga (R)
|  data-sort-value=59.2 | 59.2% R
| 
| 
| 
| 
| 
| 
| 
| 
| 
| data-sort-value=-1  | Bill Huizenga (R)
|-
! 
| 
|  data-sort-value="Slotkin Elissa" | Elissa Slotkin (D)
|  data-sort-value=-50.9 | 50.9% D
| 
| 
| 
| 
| 
| 
| 
| 
| 
| data-sort-value=-1  | Elissa Slotkin (D) 
|-
! 
| 
|  data-sort-value="Kildee Dan" | Dan Kildee (D)
|  data-sort-value=-54.4 | 54.4% D
| 
| 
| 
| 
| 
| 
| 
| 
| 
| data-sort-value=-1  | Dan Kildee (D) 
|-
! 
| 
|  | New seat
| –
| 
| 
| 
| 
| 
| 
| 
| 
| 
| data-sort-value=-1  | John James (R) 
|-
! 
| 
|  data-sort-value="Stevens Haley" | Haley Stevens (D)
|  data-sort-value=-50.2 | 50.2% D
| 
| 
| 
| 
| 
| 
| 
| 
| 
| data-sort-value=-1  | Haley Stevens (D) 
|-
! 
| 
|  data-sort-value="Finstad Brad" | Brad Finstad (R)
|  data-sort-value=51.0 | 51.0% R
| 
| 
| 
| 
| 
| 
| 
| 
| 
| data-sort-value=-1  | Brad Finstad (R)
|-
! 
| 
|  data-sort-value="Craig Angie" | Angie Craig (D)
|  data-sort-value=-48.2 | 48.2% D
| 
| 
| 
| 
| 
| 
| 
| 
| 
| data-sort-value=-1  | Angie Craig (D) 
|-
! 
| 
|  data-sort-value="Phillips Dean" | Dean Phillips (D)
|  data-sort-value=-55.6 | 55.6% D
| 
| 
| 
| 
| 
| 
| 
| 
| 
| data-sort-value=-1  | Dean Phillips (D) 
|-
! 
| 
|  data-sort-value="Stauber Pete" | Pete Stauber (R)
|  data-sort-value=56.7 | 56.7% R
| 
| 
| 
| 
| 
| 
| 
| 
| 
| data-sort-value=-1  | Pete Stauber (R) 
|-
! 
| 
|  data-sort-value="Wagner Ann" | Ann Wagner (R)
|  data-sort-value=51.9 | 51.9% R
| 
| 
| 
| 
| 
| 
| 
| 
| 
| data-sort-value=-1  | Ann Wagner (R) 
|-
! 
| 
|  | New seat
| –
| 
| 
| 
| 
| 
| 
| 
| 
| 
| data-sort-value=-1  | Ryan Zinke 
|-
! 
| 
|  data-sort-value="Flood Mike" | Mike Flood (R)
|  data-sort-value=52.7 | 52.7% R
| 
| 
| 
| 
| 
| 
| 
| 
| 
| data-sort-value=-1  | Mike Flood (R)
|-
! 
| 
|  data-sort-value="Bacon Don" | Don Bacon (R)
|  data-sort-value=50.8 | 50.8% R
| 
| 
| 
| 
| 
| 
| 
| 
| 
| data-sort-value=-1  | Don Bacon (R) 
|-
! 
| 
|  data-sort-value="Titus Dina" | Dina Titus (D)
|  data-sort-value=-61.8 | 61.8% D
| 
| 
| 
| 
| 
| 
| 
| 
| 
| data-sort-value=-1  | Dina Titus (D) 
|-
! 
| 
|  data-sort-value="Amodei Mark" | Mark Amodei (R)
|  data-sort-value=56.5 | 56.5% R
| 
| 
| 
| 
| 
| 
| 
| 
| 
| data-sort-value=-1  | Mark Amodei (R) 
|-
! 
| 
|  data-sort-value="Lee Susie" | Susie Lee (D)
|  data-sort-value=-48.8 | 48.8% D
|  
| 
| 
| 
| 
| 
| 
| 
| 
| data-sort-value=-1  | Susie Lee (D) 
|-
! 
| 
|  data-sort-value="Horsford Steven" | Steven Horsford (D)
|  data-sort-value=-50.7 | 50.7% D
| 
| 
| 
| 
| 
| 
| 
| 
| 
| data-sort-value=-1  | Steven Horsford (D) 
|-
! 
| 
|  data-sort-value="Pappas Chris" | Chris Pappas (D)
|  data-sort-value=-51.3 | 51.3% D
| 
| 
| 
| 
| 
| 
| 
| 
| 
| data-sort-value=-1  | Chris Pappas (D) 
|-
! 
| 
|  data-sort-value="Kuster Annie" | Annie Kuster (D)
|  data-sort-value=-53.9 | 53.9% D
| 
| 
| 
| 
| 
| 
| 
| 
| 
| data-sort-value=-1  | Annie Kuster (D) 
|-
! 
| 
|  data-sort-value="Norcross Donald" | Donald Norcross (D)
|  data-sort-value=-62.5 | 62.5% D
| 
| 
| 
| 
| 
| 
| 
| 
| 
| data-sort-value=-1  | Donald Norcross (D) 
|-
! 
| 
|  data-sort-value="Van Drew Jeff" | Jeff Van Drew (R)
|  data-sort-value=51.9 | 51.9% R
| 
| 
| 
| 
| 
| 
| 
| 
| 
| data-sort-value=-1  | Jeff Van Drew (R) 
|-
! 
| 
|  data-sort-value="Kim Andy" | Andy Kim (D)
|  data-sort-value=-53.2 | 53.2% D
| 
| 
| 
| 
| 
| 
| 
| 
| 
| data-sort-value=-1  | Andy Kim (D) 
|-
! 
| 
|  data-sort-value="Gottheimer Josh" | Josh Gottheimer (D)
|  data-sort-value=-53.2 | 53.2% D
| 
| 
| 
| 
| 
| 
| 
| 
| 
| data-sort-value=-1  | Josh Gottheimer (D) 
|-
! 
| 
|  data-sort-value="Malinowski Tom" | Tom Malinowski (D)
|  data-sort-value=-50.6 | 50.6% D
| 
| 
| 
| 
| 
| 
| 
| 
| 
| data-sort-value=-1  | Thomas Kean Jr. (R)
|-
! 
| 
|  data-sort-value="Pascrell Bill" | Bill Pascrell (D)
|  data-sort-value=-65.8 | 65.8% D
| 
| 
| 
| 
| 
| 
| 
| 
| 
| data-sort-value=-1  | Bill Pascrell (D) 
|-
! 
| 
|  data-sort-value="Sherrill Mikie" | Mikie Sherrill (D)
|  data-sort-value=-53.3 | 53.3% D
| 
| 
| 
| 
| 
| 
| 
| 
| 
| data-sort-value=-1  | Mikie Sherrill (D) 
|-
! 
| 
|  data-sort-value="Stansbury Melanie" | Melanie Stansbury (D)
|  data-sort-value=-60.4 | 60.4% D
| 
| 
| 
| 
| 
| 
| 
| 
| 
| data-sort-value=-1  | Melanie Stansbury (D) 
|-
! 
| 
|  data-sort-value="Herrell Yvette" | Yvette Herrell (R)
|  data-sort-value=53.7 | 53.7% R
| 
| 
| 
| 
| 
| 
| 
| 
| 
| data-sort-value=-1  | Gabe Vasquez (D) 
|-
! 
| 
|  data-sort-value="Leger Fernandez Teresa" | Teresa Leger Fernandez (D)
|  data-sort-value=-58.7 | 58.7% D
| 
| 
| 
| 
| 
| 
| 
| 
| 
| data-sort-value=-1  | Teresa Leger Fernandez (D) 
|-
! 
| 
|  data-sort-value="Zeldin Lee" | Lee Zeldin (R)
|  data-sort-value=54.9 | 54.9% R
| 
| 
| 
| 
| 
| 
| 
| 
| 
| data-sort-value=-1  | Nick LaLota (R)
|-
! 
| 
|  data-sort-value="Garbarino Andrew" | Andrew Garbarino (R)
|  data-sort-value=52.9 | 52.9% R
| 
| 
| 
| 
| 
| 
| 
| 
| 
| data-sort-value=-1  | Andrew Garbarino (R) 
|-
! 
| 
|  data-sort-value="Suozzi Thomas" | Thomas Suozzi (D)
|  data-sort-value=-56.0 | 56.0% D
| 
| 
| 
| 
| 
| 
| 
| 
| 
| data-sort-value=-1  | George Santos (R)
|-
! 
| 
|  data-sort-value="Rice Kathleen" | Kathleen Rice (D)
|  data-sort-value=-56.1 | 56.1% D
| 
| 
| 
| 
| 
| 
| 
| 
| 
| data-sort-value=-1  | Anthony D'Esposito (R)
|-
! 
| 
|  data-sort-value="Malliotakis Nicole" | Nicole Malliotakis (R)
|  data-sort-value=53.2 | 53.2% R
| 
| 
| 
| 
| 
| 
| 
| 
| 
| data-sort-value=-1  | Nicole Malliotakis (R) 
|-
! 
| 
|  data-sort-value="Maloney Sean Patrick" | Sean Patrick Maloney (D)
|  data-sort-value=-55.8 | 55.8% D
| 
| 
| 
| 
| 
| 
| 
| 
| 
| data-sort-value=-1  | Mike Lawler (R)
|-
! 
| 
|  data-sort-value="Ryan Pat" | Pat Ryan (D)
|  data-sort-value=-51.9 | 51.9% D
| 
| 
| 
| 
| 
| 
| 
| 
| 
| data-sort-value=-1  | Pat Ryan (D) 
|-
! 
| 
|  | New seat
| –
| 
| 
| 
| 
| 
| 
| 
| 
| 
| data-sort-value=-1  | Marc Molinaro (R) 
|-
! 
| 
|  data-sort-value="Tonko Paul" | Paul Tonko (D)
|  data-sort-value=-61.2 | 61.2% D
| 
| 
| 
| 
| 
| 
| 
| 
| 
| data-sort-value=-1  | Paul Tonko (D) 
|-
! 
| 
|  data-sort-value="Katko John" | John Katko (R)
|  data-sort-value=53.1 | 53.1% R
| 
| 
| 
| 
| 
| 
| 
| 
| 
| data-sort-value=-1  | Brandon Williams (R) 
|-
! 
| 
|  data-sort-value="Morelle Joseph" | Joseph Morelle (D)
|  data-sort-value=-59.3 | 59.3% D
| 
| 
| 
| 
| 
| 
| 
| 
| 
| data-sort-value=-1  | Joseph Morelle (D) 
|-
! 
| 
|  data-sort-value="Higgins Brian" | Brian Higgins (D)
|  data-sort-value=-69.9 | 69.9% D
| 
| 
| 
| 
| 
| 
| 
| 
| 
| data-sort-value=-1  | Brian Higgins (D) 
|-
! 
| 
|  data-sort-value="Butterfield G. K." | G. K. Butterfield (D)
|  data-sort-value=-54.2 | 54.2% D
| 
| 
| 
| 
| 
| 
| 
| 
| 
| data-sort-value=-1  | Don Davis (D)
|-
! 
| 
|  data-sort-value="Manning Kathy" | Kathy Manning (D)
|  data-sort-value=-62.3 | 62.3% D
| 
| 
| 
| 
| 
| 
| 
| 
| 
| data-sort-value=-1  | Kathy Manning (D) 
|-
! 
| 
|  data-sort-value="Rouzer David" | David Rouzer (R)
|  data-sort-value=60.2 | 60.2% R
| 
| 
| 
| 
| 
| 
| 
| 
| 
| data-sort-value=-1  | David Rouzer (R) 
|-
! 
| 
|  data-sort-value="Hudson Richard" | Richard Hudson (R)
|  data-sort-value=53.3 | 53.3% R
| 
| 
| 
| 
| 
| 
| 
| 
| 
| data-sort-value=-1  | Richard Hudson (R)
|-
! 
| 
|  data-sort-value="Cawthorn Madison" | Madison Cawthorn (R)
|  data-sort-value=54.5 | 54.5% R
| 
| 
| 
| 
| 
| 
| 
| 
| 
| data-sort-value=-1  | Chuck Edwards (R)
|-
! 
| 
|  | New seat
| –
| 
| 
| 
| 
| 
| 
| 
| 
| 
| data-sort-value=-1  | Wiley Nickel (D) 
|-
! 
| 
|  | New seat
| –
| 
| 
| 
| 
| 
| 
| 
| 
| 
| data-sort-value=-1  | Jeff Jackson (D)
|-
! 
| 
|  data-sort-value="Chabot Steve" | Steve Chabot (R)
|  data-sort-value=51.8 | 51.8% R
| 
| 
| 
| 
| 
| 
| 
| 
| 
| data-sort-value=-1  | Greg Landsman (D)
|-
! 
| 
|  data-sort-value="Gibbs Bob" | Bob Gibbs (R)
|  data-sort-value=67.5 | 67.5% R
| 
| 
| 
| 
| 
| 
| 
| 
| 
| data-sort-value=-1  | Max Miller (R)
|-
! 
| 
|  data-sort-value="Kaptur Marcy" | Marcy Kaptur (D)
|  data-sort-value=-63.1 | 63.1% D
| 
| 
| 
| 
| 
| 
| 
| 
| 
| data-sort-value=-1  | Marcy Kaptur (D) 
|-
! 
| 
|  data-sort-value="Turner Mike" | Mike Turner (R)
|  data-sort-value=58.4 | 58.4% R
| 
| 
| 
| 
| 
| 
| 
| 
| 
| data-sort-value=-1  | Mike Turner (R)
|-
! 
| 
|  data-sort-value="Ryan Tim" | Tim Ryan (D)
|  data-sort-value=-52.5 | 52.5% D
| 
| 
| 
| 
| 
| 
| 
| 
| 
| data-sort-value=-1  | Emilia Sykes (D)
|-
! 
| 
|  data-sort-value="Carey Mike" | Mike Carey (R)
|  data-sort-value=58.3 | 58.3% R
| 
| 
| 
| 
| 
| 
| 
| 
| 
| data-sort-value=-1  | Mike Carey (R) 
|-
! 
| 
|  data-sort-value="DeFazio Peter" | Peter DeFazio (D)
|  data-sort-value=-51.5 | 51.5% D
| 
| 
| 
| 
| 
| 
| 
| 
| 
| data-sort-value=-1  | Val Hoyle (D) 
|-
! 
| 
|  data-sort-value="Schrader Kurt" | Kurt Schrader (D)
|  data-sort-value=-51.9 | 51.9% D
| 
| 
| 
| 
| 
| 
| 
| 
| 
| data-sort-value=-1  | Lori Chavez-DeRemer (R)
|-
! 
| 
|  | New seat
| –
| 
| 
| 
| 
| 
| 
| 
| 
| 
| data-sort-value=-1  | Andrea Salinas (D)
|-
! 
| 
|  data-sort-value="Fitzpatrick Brian" | Brian Fitzpatrick (R)
|  data-sort-value=56.6 | 56.6% R
| 
| 
| 
| 
| 
| 
| 
| 
| 
| data-sort-value=-1  | Brian Fitzpatrick (R) 
|-
! 
| 
|  data-sort-value="Houlahan Chrissy" | Chrissy Houlahan (D)
|  data-sort-value=-56.1 | 56.1% D
| 
| 
| 
| 
| 
| 
| 
| 
| 
| data-sort-value=-1  | Chrissy Houlahan (D) 
|-
! 
| 
|  data-sort-value="Wild Susan" | Susan Wild (D)
|  data-sort-value=-51.9 | 51.9% D
| 
| 
| 
| 
| 
| 
| 
| 
| 
| data-sort-value=-1  | Susan Wild (D) 
|-
! 
| 
|  data-sort-value="Cartwright Matt" | Matt Cartwright (D)
|  data-sort-value=-51.8 | 51.8% D
| 
| 
| 
| 
| 
| 
| 
| 
| 
| data-sort-value=-1  | Matt Cartwright (D)
|-
! 
| 
|  data-sort-value="Perry Scott" | Scott Perry (R)
|  data-sort-value=53.3 | 53.3% R
| 
| 
| 
| 
| 
| 
| 
| 
| 
| data-sort-value=-1  | Scott Perry (R) 
|-
! 
| 
|  data-sort-value="Doyle Mike" | Mike Doyle (D)
|  data-sort-value=-69.3 | 69.3% D
| 
| 
| 
| 
| 
| 
| 
| 
| 
| data-sort-value=-1  | Summer Lee (D)
|-
! 
| 
|  data-sort-value="Lamb Conor" | Conor Lamb (D)
|  data-sort-value=-51.1 | 51.1% D
| 
| 
| 
| 
| 
| 
| 
| 
| 
| data-sort-value=-1  | Chris Deluzio (D)
|-
! 
| 
|  data-sort-value="Langevin James" | James Langevin (D)
|  data-sort-value=-58.2 | 58.2% D
| 
| 
| 
| 
| 
| 
| 
| 
| 
| data-sort-value=-1  | Seth Magaziner (D)
|-
! 
| 
|  data-sort-value="Mace Nancy" | Nancy Mace (R)
|  data-sort-value=50.6 | 50.6% R
| 
| 
| 
| 
| 
| 
| 
| 
| 
| data-sort-value=-1  | Nancy Mace (R) 
|-
! 
| 
|  data-sort-value="Cooper Jim" | Jim Cooper (D)
|  data-sort-value=-100.0 | 100.0% D
| 
| 
| 
| 
| 
| 
| 
| 
| 
| data-sort-value=-1  | Andy Ogles (R)
|-
! 
| 
|  | New seat
| –
| 
| 
| 
| 
| 
| 
| 
| 
| 
| data-sort-value=-1  | Monica De La Cruz (R) 
|-
! 
| 
|  data-sort-value="Gonzalez Tony" | Tony Gonzales (R)
|  data-sort-value=50.6 | 50.6% R
| 
| 
| 
| 
| 
| 
| 
| 
| 
| data-sort-value=-1  | Tony Gonzales (R) 
|-
! 
| 
|  data-sort-value="Cuellar Henry" | Henry Cuellar (D)
|  data-sort-value=-58.3 | 58.3% D
| 
| 
| 
| 
| 
| 
| 
| 
| 
| data-sort-value=-1  | Henry Cuellar (D) 
|-
! 
| 
|  data-sort-value="Gonzalez Vicente" | Vicente Gonzalez (D) andMayra Flores (R)
|  data-sort-value=-50.5 | 50.5% D; 50.9% R
| 
| 
| 
| 
| 
| 
| 
| 
| 
| data-sort-value=-1  | Vicente Gonzalez (D)
|-
! 
| 
|  data-sort-value="Wittman Rob" | Rob Wittman (R)
|  data-sort-value=58.2 | 58.2% R
| 
| 
| 
| 
| 
| 
| 
| 
| 
| data-sort-value=-1  | Rob Wittman (R) 
|-
! 
| 
|  data-sort-value="Luria Elaine" | Elaine Luria (D)
|  data-sort-value=-51.6 | 51.6% D
| 
| 
| 
| 
| 
| 
| 
| 
| 
| data-sort-value=-1  | Jen Kiggans (R)
|-
! 
| 
|  data-sort-value="Good Bob" | Bob Good (R)
|  data-sort-value=52.4 | 52.4% R
| 
| 
| 
| 
| 
| 
| 
| 
| 
| data-sort-value=-1  | Bob Good (R)
|-
! 
| 
|  data-sort-value="Spanberger Abigail" | Abigail Spanberger (D)
|  data-sort-value=-50.8 | 50.8% D
| 
| 
| 
| 
| 
| 
| 
| 
| 
| data-sort-value=-1  | Abigail Spanberger (D) 
|-
! 
| 
|  data-sort-value="Wexton Jennifer" | Jennifer Wexton (D)
|  data-sort-value=-56.5 | 56.5% D
| 
| 
| 
| 
| 
| 
| 
| 
| 
| data-sort-value=-1  | Jennifer Wexton (D) 

|-
! 
| 
|  data-sort-value="Herrera Beutler Jaime" | Jaime Herrera Beutler (R) 
|  data-sort-value=56.4 | 56.4% R
| 
| 
| 
| 
| 
| 
| 
| 
| 
| data-sort-value=-1  | Marie Gluesenkamp Perez (D) 
|-
! 
| 
|  data-sort-value="McMorris Rodgers Cathy" | Cathy McMorris Rodgers (R)
|  data-sort-value=61.3 | 61.3% R
| 
| 
| 
| 
| 
| 
| 
| 
| 
| data-sort-value=-1  | Cathy McMorris Rodgers (R) 
|-
! 
| 
|  data-sort-value="Kilmer Derek" | Derek Kilmer (D)
|  data-sort-value=-59.3 | 59.3% D
| 
| 
| 
| 
| 
| 
| 
| 
| 
| data-sort-value=-1  | Derek Kilmer (D) 
|-
! 
| 
|  data-sort-value="Schrier Kim" | Kim Schrier (D)
|  data-sort-value=-51.7 | 51.7% D
| 
| 
| 
| 
| 
| 
| 
| 
| 
| data-sort-value=-1  | Kim Schrier (D)

|-
! 
| 
|  data-sort-value="Strickland Marilyn" | Marilyn Strickland (D)
|  data-sort-value=-49.3 | 49.3% D
| 
| 
| 
| 
| 
| 
| 
| 
| 
| data-sort-value=-1  | Marilyn Strickland (D)
|-
! 
| 
|  data-sort-value="Steil Bryan" | Bryan Steil (R)
|  data-sort-value=59.3 | 59.3% R
| 
| 
| 
| 
| 
| 
| 
| 
| 
| data-sort-value=-1  | Bryan Steil (R)
|-
! 
| 
|  data-sort-value="Kind Ron" | Ron Kind (D)
|  data-sort-value=-51.3 | 51.3% D
| 
| 
| 
| 
| 
| 
| 
| 
| 
| data-sort-value=-1  | Derrick Van Orden (R)
|-

! colspan=4 | Overall
|  | D – 191R – 21133 tossups
|  | D – 199R – 21620 tossups
|  | D – 198R – 237
|  | D – 195R – 21327 tossups
|  | D – 174R – 22738 tossups
|  | D – 186R – 21633 tossups
|  | D – 200R – 22312 tossups
|  | D – 203R – 21913 tossups
|  | D – 200 R – 208 27 tossups
|  | D - 213  9  R - 222  9  
|- valign=top
! District
! CPVI
! Incumbent
! Previous result
! Cook
! IE
! Sabato
! Politico
! RCP
! Fox
! DDHQ
! 538
! Econ.
! Winner

Generic ballot polls 

The following is a list of generic party ballot polls conducted in advance of the 2022 House of Representatives elections.

Party listings
The campaign committees for the two parties (the DCCC and NRCC) publish their own lists of targeted seats.

Democratic-held seats
The NRCC is now targeting 85 Democratic held seats.  They released their initial list February 10, 2021 and added 10 seats to the initial list on May 4, 2021 and a further 13 seats November 3, 2021 after the favorable election night results. They added eight additional seats on March 30, 2022. The first two lists were published before redistricting, however the 3rd list begins to incorporate  redistricting impacts such as Colorado's 7th congressional district. 
Seats in bold were included in the DCCC's frontline seats in March 2021 or were added in January 2022.
 

 : Tom O'Halleran
 : Greg Stanton
 : Ann Kirkpatrick (retiring)
 : None (new seat)
 : Ami Bera
 : Josh Harder
 : Barbara Lee (running in )
 : Jim Costa
 : Julia Brownley
 : Raul Ruiz   
 : Katie Porter
 : Mike Levin 
 : Ed Perlmutter (retiring)
 : Joe Courtney
 : Jahana Hayes
 : Stephanie Murphy (retiring)
 : Darren Soto
 : Charlie Crist (retiring)
 : Kathy Castor
 : Ted Deutch (retiring)
 : Sanford Bishop
 : Lucy McBath (running in )
 : Carolyn Bourdeaux (lost renomination)
 : Marie Newman (lost renomination)
 : Sean Casten
 : Raja Krishnamoorthi
 : Bill Foster
 : Lauren Underwood
 : Cheri Bustos (retiring)
 : Frank Mrvan
 : Cindy Axne
 : Sharice Davids
 : Jared Golden
 : Dutch Ruppersberger
 : John Sarbanes
 : David Trone
 : Elissa Slotkin
 : Dan Kildee 
 : Haley Stevens
 : Angie Craig
 : Dean Phillips
 : Dina Titus
 : Susie Lee
 : Steven Horsford
 : Chris Pappas
 : Annie Kuster
 : Andy Kim
 : Josh Gottheimer
 : Tom Malinowski
 : Mikie Sherrill
 : Melanie Stansbury
 : Teresa Leger Fernandez
 : Thomas Suozzi
 : Kathleen Rice (retiring)
 : Mondaire Jones (lost renomination)
 : Sean Patrick Maloney (running in )
 : Paul Tonko
 : Joe Morelle 
 : Brian Higgins  
 : G.K. Butterfield (retiring)
 : Deborah Ross
 : Kathy Manning
 : Jeff Jackson
 : Marcy Kaptur
 : Tim Ryan (retiring)
 : Peter DeFazio (retiring)
 : Kurt Schrader (lost renomination)
 : None (new seat)
 : Madeleine Dean
 : Mary Gay Scanlon
 : Chrissy Houlahan 
 : Susan Wild : Matt Cartwright : Mike Doyle (retiring)
 : Conor Lamb (retiring)
 : Jim Cooper (retiring)
 : Lizzie Fletcher
 : Vicente Gonzalez (running in )
 : Henry Cuellar
 : Colin Allred : Elaine Luria : Abigail Spanberger : Jennifer Wexton : Kim Schrier : Ron Kind (retiring)

Republican-held seats
On April 6, 2021, the DCCC released their list of target seats, including open and Republican-held seats. This list was published before redistricting. Several seats were added in January 2022.
 

 : David Schweikert
 : David Valadao
 : Mike Garcia
 : Young Kim
 : Ken Calvert
 : Michelle Steel
 : Carlos Giménez
 : Maria Elvira Salazar
 : Victoria Spartz
 : Ashley Hinson
 : Mariannette Miller-Meeks
 : Andy Harris
 : Peter Meijer (lost renomination)
 : Ann Wagner
 : Don Bacon
 : Yvette Herrell
 : Andrew Garbarino
 : John Katko (retiring)
 : Claudia Tenney
 : Steve Chabot
 : Brian Fitzpatrick
 : Scott Perry
 : Tony Gonzales
 : Beth Van Duyne
 : Burgess Owens

References 

House